Peter Dunn may refer to:
 Peter Dunn (author) (born 1977), American financial author and radio host
 Peter Dunn (cricketer) (1921–2004), Australian cricketer
 Peter Dunn (engineer) (1927–2014), British engineer
 Peter Dunn (general) (born 1947), Australian general and ACT Emergency Services Commissioner
Peter Dunn (historian), Australian historian
 Peter Dunn (paediatrician) (born 1929), British paediatrician
 Peter Dunn (politician) (born 1935), South Australian politician

See also
 Pete Dunn, baseball coach
 Peter Dunne (disambiguation)